Jair Abimelet Reyes Vidal (born 11 July 2000) is an Ecuadorian weightlifter. He won the gold medal in the men's 67 kg event at the 2022 Pan American Weightlifting Championships held in Bogotá, Colombia. He won two silver medals at the 2022 Bolivarian Games held in Valledupar, Colombia.

He won the bronze medal in the men's 67 kg event at the 2021 Pan American Weightlifting Championships held in Guayaquil, Ecuador. He competed in the men's 67 kg event at the 2021 World Weightlifting Championships held in Tashkent, Uzbekistan.

He won the silver medal in his event at the 2022 South American Games held in Asunción, Paraguay.

Achievements

References

External links 
 

Living people
2000 births
Ecuadorian male weightlifters
Pan American Weightlifting Championships medalists
South American Games silver medalists for Ecuador
South American Games medalists in weightlifting
Competitors at the 2022 South American Games
21st-century Ecuadorian people